The 2021–22 Maine Black Bears men's basketball team represented the University of Maine in the 2021–22 NCAA Division I men's basketball season. They played their home games at the Cross Insurance Center in Bangor, Maine and were led by fourth-year head coach Richard Barron until his resignation on February 17, 2022. Assistant coach Jai Steadman was named the interim head coach for the remainder of the season. They were members of the America East Conference. They finished the season 6–23, 3–15 in America East play to finish in last place. They failed to qualify for the America East Tournament.

On March 21, 2022, the school named former Maine player and Boston College assistant coach Chris Markwood the team's new head coach.

Previous season
In a season limited due to the ongoing COVID-19 pandemic, the school opted out of the rest of the season on February 13, 2021 after playing only nine games. The Black Bears finished the 2020–21 season 2–7, 2–6 in America East play to finish in 10th place.

Roster

Schedule and results

|-
!colspan=12 style=| Non-conference regular season

|-
!colspan=12 style=| America East Conference regular season

Source

References

Maine Black Bears men's basketball seasons
Maine Black Bears
Maine Black Bears men's basketball
Maine Black Bears men's basketball